Seung-ah, also spelled Seung-a, is a Korean feminine given name.

People with this name include:
Seo Seung-ah (born Lee Na-young, 1983), South Korean actress
Yoon Seung-ah (born 1983), South Korean actress
Oh Seung-ah (born Oh Se-mi, 1988), South Korean singer and actress, former member of girl group Rainbow

Fictional characters with this name include:
 Oh Seung-ah, in 2009 South Korean television series On Air

See also
List of Korean given names

Korean feminine given names